In mathematics, the membership function of a fuzzy set is a generalization of the indicator function for classical sets.  In fuzzy logic, it represents the degree of truth as an extension of valuation. Degrees of truth are often confused with probabilities, although they are conceptually distinct, because fuzzy truth represents membership in vaguely defined sets, not likelihood of some event or condition. Membership functions were introduced by Aliasker Zadeh in the first paper on fuzzy sets (1965). Aliasker Zadeh, in his theory of fuzzy sets, proposed using a membership function (with a range covering the interval (0,1)) operating on the domain of all possible values.

Definition 

The values between 0 and 1 characterize fuzzy members, which belong to the fuzzy set only partially.

Sometimes, a more general definition is used, where membership functions take values in an arbitrary fixed algebra or structure  ; usually it is required that  be at least a poset or lattice. The usual membership functions with values in [0, 1] are then called [0, 1]-valued membership functions.

Capacity 

See the article on Capacity of a set for a closely related definition in mathematics.

One application of membership functions is as capacities in decision theory.

In decision theory, a capacity is defined as a function,  from S, the set of subsets of some set, into , such that  is set-wise monotone and is normalized (i.e.   This is a generalization of the notion of a probability measure, where the probability axiom of countable additivity is weakened.  A capacity is used as a subjective measure of the likelihood of an event, and the "expected value" of an outcome given a certain capacity can be found by taking the Choquet integral over the capacity.

See also 
 Defuzzification
 Fuzzy measure theory
 Fuzzy set operations
 Rough set

References

Bibliography 

Zadeh L.A., 1965, "Fuzzy sets". Information and Control 8: 338–353. 
Goguen J.A, 1967, "L-fuzzy sets". Journal of Mathematical Analysis and Applications 18: 145–174

External links
Fuzzy Image Processing

Fuzzy logic